G.711 is a narrowband audio codec originally designed for use in telephony that provides toll-quality audio at 64 kbit/s. G.711 passes audio signals in the range of 300–3400 Hz and samples them at the rate of 8,000 samples per second, with the tolerance on that rate of 50 parts per million (ppm). Non-uniform (logarithmic) quantization with 8 bits is used to represent each sample, resulting in a 64 kbit/s bit rate. There are two slightly different versions: μ-law, which is used primarily in North America and Japan, and A-law, which is in use in most other countries outside North America.

G.711 is an ITU-T standard (Recommendation) for audio companding, titled Pulse code modulation (PCM) of voice frequencies released for use in 1972. It is a required standard in many technologies, such as in the H.320 and H.323 standards. It can also be used for fax communication over IP networks (as defined in T.38 specification). 

Two enhancements to G.711 have been published: G.711.0 utilizes lossless data compression to reduce the bandwidth usage and G.711.1 increases audio quality by increasing bandwidth.

Features
 8 kHz sampling frequency
 64 kbit/s bitrate (8 kHz sampling frequency × 8 bits per sample)
 Typical algorithmic delay is 0.125 ms, with no look-ahead delay
 G.711 is a waveform speech coder
 G.711 Appendix I defines a packet loss concealment (PLC) algorithm to help hide transmission losses in a packetized network
 G.711 Appendix II defines a discontinuous transmission (DTX) algorithm which uses voice activity detection (VAD) and comfort noise generation (CNG) to reduce bandwidth usage during silence periods
 PSQM testing under ideal conditions yields mean opinion scores of 4.45 for G.711 μ-law, 4.45 for G.711 A-law
 PSQM testing under network stress yields mean opinion scores of 4.13 for G.711 μ-law, 4.11 for G.711 A-law

Types
G.711 defines two main companding algorithms, the μ-law algorithm and A-law algorithm. Both are logarithmic, but A-law was specifically designed to be simpler for a computer to process. The standard also defines a sequence of repeating code values which defines the power level of 0 dB.

The μ-law and A-law algorithms encode 14-bit and 13-bit signed linear PCM samples (respectively) to logarithmic 8-bit samples. Thus, the G.711 encoder will create a 64 kbit/s bitstream for a signal sampled at 8 kHz.

G.711 μ-law tends to give more resolution to higher range signals while G.711 A-law provides more quantization levels at lower signal levels.

The terms PCMU, G711u or G711MU for G711 μ-law, and PCMA or G711A for G711 A-law, are used.

A-law 

A-law encoding thus takes a 13-bit signed linear audio sample as input and converts it to an 8 bit value as follows:

Where  is the sign bit,  is its inverse (i.e. positive values are encoded with MSB =  = 1), and bits marked  are discarded. Note that the first column of the table uses different representation of negative values than the third column. So for example, input decimal value −21 is represented in binary after bit inversion as 1000000010100, which maps to 00001010 (according to the first row of the table). When decoding, this maps back to 1000000010101, which is interpreted as output value −21 in decimal. Input value +52 (0000000110100 in binary) maps to 10011010 (according to the second row), which maps back to 0000000110101 (+53 in decimal).

This can be seen as a floating-point number with 4 bits of mantissa  (equivalent to a 5-bit precision), 3 bits of exponent  and 1 sign bit , formatted as eeemmmm with the decoded linear value  given by formula

which is a 13-bit signed integer in the range ±1 to ±(2 − 2). Note that no compressed code decodes to zero due to the addition of 0.5 (half of a quantization step).

In addition, the standard specifies that all resulting even bits (LSB is even) are inverted before the octet is transmitted. This is to provide plenty of 0/1 transitions to facilitate the clock recovery process in the PCM receivers. Thus, a silent A-law encoded PCM channel has the 8 bit samples coded 0xD5 instead of 0x80 in the octets.

When data is sent over E0 (G.703), MSB (sign) is sent first and LSB is sent last.

ITU-T STL defines the algorithm for decoding as follows (it puts the decoded values in the 13 most significant bits of the 16-bit output data type).

void            alaw_expand(lseg, logbuf, linbuf)
  long            lseg;
  short          *linbuf;
  short          *logbuf;
{
  short           ix, mant, iexp;
  long            n;

  for (n = 0; n < lseg; n++)
  {
    ix = logbuf[n] ^ (0x0055);	/* re-toggle toggled bits */

    ix &= (0x007F);		/* remove sign bit */
    iexp = ix >> 4;		/* extract exponent */
    mant = ix & (0x000F);	/* now get mantissa */
    if (iexp > 0)
      mant = mant + 16;		/* add leading '1', if exponent > 0 */

    mant = (mant << 4) + (0x0008);	/* now mantissa left justified and */
    /* 1/2 quantization step added */
    if (iexp > 1)		/* now left shift according exponent */
      mant = mant << (iexp - 1);

    linbuf[n] = logbuf[n] > 127	/* invert, if negative sample */
      ? mant
      : -mant;
  }
}

See also "ITU-T Software Tool Library 2009 User's manual" that can be found at.

μ-law 

The μ-law (sometimes referred to as ulaw, G.711Mu, or G.711μ) encoding takes a 14-bit signed linear audio sample in two's complement representation as input, inverts all bits after the sign bit if the value is negative, adds 33 (binary 100001) and converts it to an 8 bit value as follows:

Where  is the sign bit, and bits marked  are discarded.

In addition, the standard specifies that the encoded bits are inverted before the octet is transmitted. Thus, a silent μ-law encoded PCM channel has the 8 bit samples transmitted 0xFF instead of 0x00 in the octets.

Adding 33 is necessary so that all values fall into a compression group and it is subtracted back when decoding. 

Breaking the encoded value formatted as seeemmmm into 4 bits of mantissa , 3 bits of exponent  and 1 sign bit , the decoded linear value  is given by formula

which is a 14-bit signed integer in the range ±0 to ±8031.

Note that 0 is transmitted as 0xFF, and −1 is transmitted as 0x7F, but when received the result is 0 in both cases.

G.711.0 
G.711.0, also known as G.711 LLC, utilizes lossless data compression to reduce the bandwidth usage by as much as 50 percent. The Lossless compression of G.711 pulse code modulation standard was approved by ITU-T in September 2009.

G.711.1 
G.711.1 "Wideband embedded extension for G.711 pulse code modulation" is a higher-fidelity extension to G.711, ratified in 2008 and further extended in 2012.

G.711.1 allows a series of enhancement layers on top of a raw G.711 core stream (Layer 0): Layer 1 codes 16-bit audio in the same 4kHz narrowband, and Layer 2 allows 8kHz wideband using MDCT; each uses a fixed 16kbps in addition to the 64kbps core. They may be used together or singly, and each encodes the differences from the previous layer. Ratified in 2012, Layer 3 extends Layer 2 to 16kHz "superwideband," allowing another 16kbps for the highest frequencies, while retaining layer independence. Peak bitrate becomes 96 kbps in original G.711.1, or 112 kbps with superwideband. No internal method of identifying or separating the layers is defined, leaving it to the implementation to packetize or signal them.

A decoder that doesn't understand any set of fidelity layers may ignore or drop non-core packets without affecting it, enabling graceful degradation across any G.711 (or original G.711.1) telephony system with no changes.

Also ratified in 2012 was G.711.0 lossless extended to the new fidelity layers. Like G.711.0, full G.711 backward compatibility is sacrificed for efficiency, though a G.711.0 aware node may still ignore or drop layer packets it doesn't understand.

Licensing 
The patents for G.711, released in 1972, have expired, so it may be used without the need for a licence.

See also 
List of codecs
Comparison of audio coding formats
RTP audio video profile
Au file format

References

External links 
 ITU-T Recommendation G.711
 ITU-T G.191 software tools for speech and audio coding, including G.711 C code
 Code Project C# implementation of G.711 with source code
 RFC 3551 - RTP Profile for Audio and Video Conferences with Minimal Control - G.711 - PCMA and PCMU definition.
 RFC 4856 - Registration of Media Type audio/PCMA and audio/PCMU
  - RTP Payload Format for ITU-T Recommendation G.711.1 (PCMA-WB and PCMU-WB)

Audio codecs
Speech codecs
ITU-T recommendations
ITU-T G Series Recommendations
Telecommunications-related introductions in 1972